The Toledo Goaldiggers were a minor professional ice hockey club based in Toledo, Ohio, from 1974 to 1986.  They played in the International Hockey League (IHL) and held their home games at the Toledo Sports Arena on the east side of Toledo.  Prior to the Goaldiggers, Toledo had two minor league franchises: The Mercurys (1947–1962) and Blades/Hornets (1963–1974).

History
During their 12-year history, the Goaldiggers qualified for the post season 10 times, reaching the playoff finals six times (1975, 1977, 1978, 1982, 1983 and 1984) winning four Turner Cup playoff championships (1975, 1978, 1982, and 1983).  Also, the "Diggers" won two regular season championships (Fred A. Huber, Jr. Memorial Trophy) finishing with the most points in the IHL two consecutive seasons (1981–82 and 1982–83).

In 1981, Bill Beagan became a partial owner and the general manager of the Goaldiggers. Under his management, the team won Turner Cup championships during the 1981–82 IHL season and the 1982–83 IHL season.

After the 1985–86 season the franchise was forced to suspend operations due to financial difficulties and poor attendance.  The dormant franchise was eventually sold to Russ and Diane Parker and moved to Kansas City, Missouri, where they became the Kansas City Blades in 1990.

Season-by-season record

Franchise records

All-time leaders

References

External links
 IHL Franchise and Championship Information
HockeyDB.com history of the Toledo Goaldiggers
http://www.toledoretrohockey.com/goaldiggers-history/

International Hockey League (1945–2001) teams
Sports teams in Toledo, Ohio
Defunct ice hockey teams in the United States
Ice hockey clubs established in 1974
Sports clubs disestablished in 1986
Ice hockey teams in Ohio
California Seals minor league affiliates
Cleveland Barons minor league affiliates
New York Rangers minor league affiliates
Minnesota North Stars minor league affiliates
Philadelphia Flyers minor league affiliates
New York Islanders minor league affiliates
Los Angeles Kings minor league affiliates
Toronto Maple Leafs minor league affiliates
1974 establishments in Ohio
1986 disestablishments in Ohio